John Urquhart Jr. (1844 – December 17, 1933) was a Canadian politician, druggist, and physician. He was the mayor of Oakville, Ontario, Canada from 1888 to 1891.

Early life 
Urquhart was born in Oakville, Ontario. His father was John Urquhart, a Scottish immigrant to Canada, by way of New York, who was a surgeon and apothecary. The family lived in a combined house a business called Medical Hall in Oakville, Ontario. This building still stands as 182 Lakeshore Road East. 

At age sixteen, Urquhart ran away from home and worked as a sailor aboard Great Lakes ships. He subsequently worked as a farmer. Next, he studied at the Rolph School of Medicine in Toronto, the University of Trinity College, and the Royal College of Physicians of Edinburgh.

Career 
After his father's death, Urquhart took over the operation of Medical Hall.

Urquhart served as mayor of Oakville for two terms from 1888 to 1891.

See also
List of mayors of Oakville, Ontario

References

1844 births
1933 deaths
People from Oakville, Ontario
Mayors of Oakville, Ontario
19th-century Canadian physicians
20th-century Canadian physicians
Trinity College (Canada) alumni
Canadian pharmacists